Muğlaspor is a sports club in located in Muğla, Turkey. The football club plays in the Turkish Regional Amateur League.

References

External links 
Muğlaspor on TFF.org

 
Sport in Muğla
Football clubs in Turkey
Association football clubs established in 1967
1967 establishments in Turkey